Better Ways to Self Destruct is the 2001 EP by easyworld, an Eastbourne-based indie rock band. This was the band's second release, after their "Hundredweight" single, and this EP contained that earlier single, a new version of b-side "You Make Me Want To Drink Bleach" and 5 new songs, all recorded in lead singer David Ford's bedroom in his parents' house.

While the EP's recording budget was somewhat limited, the band still managed to build up a small fanbase, touring with King Adora, and undertaking headlining tours of their own. 5 tracks on this EP (all except "Lights Out", "Someone Do Something" and "Compilation Blues") were re-recorded for This is Where I Stand, the band's debut album proper, appearing a year later in 2002.

Track listing
 "Lights Out"
 "Hundredweight"
 "Junkies & Whores"
 "Someone Do Something"
 "A Stain to Never Fade"
 "U Make Me Want To Drink Bleach (Stylophone Mix)"
 "Try Not To Think"
 "Compilation Blues"

Easyworld albums
2001 EPs
Fierce Panda Records EPs